Matthew E. Butler is a visual effects supervisor.

He was nominated at the 84th Academy Awards in the category of Academy Award for Best Visual Effects for the film Transformers: Dark of the Moon. His nomination was shared with Scott Benza, Scott Farrar and John Frazier.

References

External links

Living people
Year of birth missing (living people)
Special effects people